Becky Ruth (born September 27, 1964) is an American politician who served in the Missouri House of Representatives from the 114th district from 2015 to 2021.

References

1964 births
Living people
Republican Party members of the Missouri House of Representatives
21st-century American politicians
Women state legislators in Missouri
21st-century American women politicians